The D.I.C.E. Award for Fighting Game of the Year is an award presented annually by the Academy of Interactive Arts & Sciences during the academy's annual D.I.C.E. Awards. This award recognizes "titles that offer the use the virtual experience of controlling a character engaging in individual combat with another character usually from a fixed camera perspective. The opponent can either be controlled by another player or by the game." It was originally title Console Fighting Game of the Year, before it was simplified to just Fighting Game of the Year in 2005.

The award's most recent winner is MultiVersus, developed by Play First Games and published by Warner Bros. Interactive Entertainment.

Winners and nominees

1990s

2000s

2010s

2020s

Multiple nominations and wins

Developers and publishers 
The combined nominations of Namco and Bandai Namco makes them the most nominated developer and publisher. They are tied with NetherRealm Studios for the most winning developer. Warner Bros. Interactive Entertainment is the top winning publisher, being the parent of NetherRealm Studios.
There have been numerous developer/publishers with back-to-back wins:
Team Ninja and Tecmo won in 2001 with Dead or Alive 2 and 2002 with Dead or Alive 3.
Namco won in 2003 with Tekken 4 and 2004 with Soulcalibur II.
Dimps and Capcom won in 2010 with Street Fighter IV and 2011 with Super Street Fighter IV.
NetherRealm Studios and Warner Bros. Interactive Entertainment won in 2020 with Mortal Kombat 11 and 2021 with Mortal Kombat 11: Ultimate
THQ is the only publisher with back-to-back wins with different developers:
1998: WCW vs. nWo: World Tour developed by Asmik Ace Entertainment.
1999: WCW/nWo Revenge developed by AKI Corporation.

Franchises 
Mortal Kombat and Street Fighter have been the most nominated franchises. Mortal Kombat has been the most awarded winning franchise, with Street Fighter, Soulcalibur and Super Smash Bros. tied with the second most wins. The WWE (formerly WWF) has the most nominations without ever having one.
There have been numerous franchises with back-to-back:
WCW vs. nWo: World Tour in 1998 and WCW/nWo Revenge in 1999.
Dead or Alive 2 in 2001 and Dead or Alive 3 in 2002.
Street Fighter IV in 2010 and Super Street Fighter IV 2011.
Mortal Kombat 11 in 2020 and Mortal Kombat 11: Ultimate in 2021
Street Fighter IV and Mortal Kombat 11 are two games with multiple wins with re-releases. Virtua Fighter 4, Tekken 5, Killer Instinct, and Guilty Gear Xrd have had multiple nominations with re-releases and DLC expansions.

Notes

References 

D.I.C.E. Awards
Awards established in 1998
Awards for best video game